Sigurður or Sigurdur may refer to:

Sigurður Bragason (born 1954), Icelandic baritone
Sigurður Breiðfjörð (1798–1846), Icelandic poet
Sigurður Eggerz (1875–1945), Prime Minister of Iceland from 1914 to 1915 and from 1922 to 1924
Sigurður Ragnar Eyjólfsson (born 1973), Icelandic football manager and former professional striker
Sigurður Grétarsson (born 1962), former Icelandic footballer who played as a striker
Sigurður Guðjónsson, an Icelandic contemporary artist
Sigurdur Helgason (airline executive) (1921–2009), innovator in low-cost airlines
Sigurdur Helgason (mathematician) (born 1927) researcher in integral geometry and symmetric spaces
Sigurður Ingi Jóhannsson (born 1962], Icelandic politician and Prime Minister
Sigurður Jónsson (disambiguation)
Sigurður Kári Kristjánsson (born 1973), Icelandic Member of Parliament for the Independence Party
Sigurður Gylfi Magnússon (born 1957), Icelandic historian specialising in microhistory
Sigurður Nordal (1886–1974), Icelandic scholar, writer, and poet
Sigurður Ólafsson (1916–2009), an Icelandic footballer
Sigurður Sigurjónsson (born 1955), Icelandic actor, comedian and screenwriter
Sigurður Þórarinsson (1912–1983), Icelandic geologist, volcanologist, glaciologist, professor and lyricist
Sigurður Þorvaldsson (born 1980), Icelandic professional basketball player

Masculine given names
Icelandic masculine given names

de:Sigurður
is:Sigurður
no:Sigurður